The following is an overview of the events of 1893 in film, including a list of films released and notable births.

Events
 Thomas Edison builds America's First Movie Studio, the Black Maria.
 Blacksmith Scene is made and presented by Thomas Edison.
First major public movie show, World's Columbian Exposition.

Films released in 1893

Blacksmith Scene, directed by William K. L. Dickson.
Horse Shoeing, a documentary short film starring and directed by William K. L. Dickson.
Rabbits, directed by Étienne-Jules Marey

Births

External links

 1893  at the Internet Movie Database

 
Film by year
Articles containing video clips